The original Porsche 911 (pronounced nine eleven) is a luxury sports car made by Porsche AG of Stuttgart, Germany. A prototype of the famous, distinctive, and durable design was shown to the public in autumn 1963. Production began in September 1964 and continued through 1989. It was succeeded by a modified version, internally referred to as Porsche 964 but still sold as Porsche 911, as are current models.

Mechanically, the 911 was notable for being rear engined and air-cooled. From its inception, the 911 was modified both by private teams and the factory itself for racing, rallying and other types of automotive competition. The original 911 series is often cited as the most successful competition car ever, especially when its variations are included, mainly the powerful 911-derived 935 which won 24 Hours of Le Mans and other major sports cars races outright against prototypes.

Introduction
The Porsche 911 was developed as a much more powerful, larger, more comfortable replacement for the Porsche 356. The new car made its public debut at the 1963 Internationale Automobil-Ausstellung, better known to English speakers as the Frankfurt Motor Show.

It was initially designated as the "Porsche 901", after its internal project number. However, Peugeot protested on the grounds that in France it had exclusive rights to car names formed by three numbers with a zero in the middle. So, instead of selling the new model with another name in France, Porsche changed the name to 911. It went on sale in 1964.

2.0-litre / O, A and B series (1964–1969)

The earliest editions of the 911 had an air-cooled, rear-mounted, 2.0 L (1,991 cc) 
 flat-6 "boxer" engine, similar to the 356's four-cylinder 1.6 L unit. It was mated to a five-speed manual "Type 901" transmission. The car had 2+2 seating, though the rear was very small, also like the 356. The styling was largely by Ferdinand "Butzi" Porsche, son of Ferdinand "Ferry" Porsche. Erwin Komenda, the leader of the Porsche car body construction department, was also involved in the design.

When 356 production came to an end in 1965, there was still a market for a 4-cylinder car, particularly in the USA. The Porsche 912, a slightly downscaled 911 fitted with the 356's  engine, was introduced the same year as its replacement.

In 1967, Porsche introduced the more powerful  911S. Alloy wheels from Fuchs, in a distinctive 5-leaf design, were offered for the first time. A  racing version of the 911 engine was developed and used in the mid-engined Porsche 904 and Porsche 906 track cars.

The Targa version, with a stainless steel-clad roll bar, appeared the same year. Porsche had feared the U.S. National Highway Traffic Safety Administration (NHTSA) would outlaw fully open convertibles, an important market for the 356.  It was equipped with a removable roof panel and a removable plastic rear window (although a fixed glass version was offered alongside from 1968).

The name "Targa" – plate or plaque in Italian – came from the Targa Florio sports car road race in Sicily, in which Porsche had scored seven victories since 1956, with four more to come through 1973. This last in the subsequently discontinued event is especially notable as it was won with a 911 Carrera RS against prototypes entered by Italian factories of Ferrari and Alfa Romeo.

The  911T was also launched in 1967 and effectively replaced the 912. The staple  model was renamed the 911L.

In 1969, the slightly lengthened B series was introduced. Fuel injection arrived both for the 911S and a new middle model, the 911E. A semi-automatic (clutchless manual) Sportomatic model, composed of a torque converter, automatic clutch, and a conventional four-speed manual transmission, was added to the product lineup.

B17 (1969)

2.2-litre / C and D series (1969–1971)
The 912 was discontinued, with the 914 taking its place as Porsche's entry model.

C 20 (1970)
Vehicle Identification Number (Vin #) 9111120162 Cabriolet "A" Symmetrical Uni-Body (Length and Width) by Erwin Komenda

2.4-litre / E and F series (1971–1973)

The 1972–1973 model years consisted of the same models of 911— the entry level T, the midrange E and the top-of-the-line S. However, all models got a new, larger  engine.

The 911E and 911S used mechanical fuel injection (MFI) in all markets. The 911T was carbureted, except in the United States where it also used MFI, which accounts for the  power difference between the two. In January 1973, U.S. 911Ts were transferred to the new K-Jetronic CIS (Continuous Fuel Injection) system from Bosch. These CIS-powered cars are usually referred to as "1973.5" models by enthusiasts.

With the power and torque increases, the 2.4 L cars also got a newer, stronger transmission, identified by its Porsche type number 915. Derived from the transmission in the Porsche 908 race car, the 915 did away with the 901/911 transmission's "dog-leg" style first gear arrangement, opting for a traditional H pattern with first gear up to the left, second gear underneath first, etc.  Some say this was because the dog-leg shift to second gear was inconvenient for city driving, other say it was due to Porsche's desire to put 5th gear outside the main transmission housing where it could easily be changed for different races. The Sportomatic transmission was still available but only as a special order.

In 1972 a tremendous effort was made to improve the handling of the 911. Due to the 911's unusual engine placement (rear-mounted, with most of the vehicle's weight concentrated over the rear axle), early 911's were prone to oversteer when driven at the limit, and could easily spin in the hands of an inexperienced driver. In an attempt to remedy this, Porsche relocated the oil tank from its position behind the right rear wheel to in front of it. This had the effect of moving the weight of almost 8.5 L (9 US quarts) of oil from outside the wheelbase to inside, improving weight distribution and thus, handling. To facilitate filling of the oil tank, Porsche installed an oil filler door (much like the fuel filler door on the left front fender) on the right rear quarter panel. Unfortunately, this unique design was scrapped after only one year, some say because inattentive gas station attendants were putting gas in the oil tank. The oil tank was subsequently relocated to its original position for model year 1973, and remained there until it was relocated within the wheelbase for the 964 models.

911S models also gained a discreet spoiler under the front bumper to improve high-speed stability. With a weight of only , these models are often regarded as the best classic mainstream 911s. For racing at this time, the 911 ST was produced in limited numbers (the production run for the ST only lasted from 1970 to 1971.) The cars were available with a choice of either 2,466 cc or 2,492 cc engines, producing  at 8,000 rpm. The cars had success at the Daytona 6 Hours, the Sebring 12 Hours, the 1000 km Nürburgring and the Targa Florio.

Carrera RS & RSR (1973 and 1974)

The Carrera RS models, valued by collectors, are considered by many to be the greatest classic 911s of all time. RS stands for Rennsport in German, meaning "racing sport". The Carrera name was reintroduced from the 356 Carrera which had itself been named after Porsche's victories in the Carrera Panamericana races in Mexico in the 1950s. The RS was built so that Porsche could enter racing formulae that demanded that a certain minimum number of production cars were made. In total, 1,580 were made, comfortably exceeding the 500 that had to be made to qualify for the vital FIA Group 4 class. 49 Carrera RSR cars were built with  engines producing .

In 1974, Porsche created the Carrera RS 3.0 with mechanical fuel injection producing . It was almost twice as expensive as the 2.7 RS but offered a fair amount of racing capability for that price. The chassis was largely similar to that of the 1973 Carrera RSR and the brake system was from the Porsche 917.

The Carrera RSR 3.0 and Carrera RSR Turbo (its 2.1 L engine due to a 1.4x equivalency formula) were made in low numbers for racing. The turbo car came second at the 24 Hours of Le Mans in 1974, a significant event in that its engine would form the basis of many future Porsche attempts in sports car racing, and can be regarded as the start of its commitment to turbocharging.

2.7-litre / G, H, I and J series (1974–1977)

The new impact bumper
MY 1974 was the introduction of impact bumpers to conform with low speed protection requirements of U.S. law, these bumpers being so successfully integrated into the design that they remained unchanged for 15 years. In 1974 the engine size was increased to 2,687 cc, giving an increase in torque. The use of K-Jetronic CIS Bosch fuel injection in two of the three models in the line up— the 911 and 911S models, retaining the narrow rear wings of the old 2.4, now had a detuned version of the RS engine producing 150 and 175 bhp (110 and 129 kW) respectively.

Carrera 2.7 / G and H (1974-1975)
The Carrera 2.7 was mechanically similar to the 1973 RS, inheriting its  MFI engine and still weighed the same at 1075 kg (2370 lb).
It had the wide RS rear wings and also the ducktail for the 1974 model (except for the German market).
It was available either as a coupe or a Targa.
For 1976 a special run of 113 coupes with MFI were made. In addition, 30 MFI Targas with narrow rear wings were made for the Belgian Police.

The US Carrera 2.7 was restricted to the 2.7 K-Jetronic engine as the MFI RS engine was banned on emission grounds.

The well known problem of pulled cylinder head studs with the K-Jetronic 2.7 engine only occurred in hot climates. This emerged in 1975 in California where thermal reactors, aimed at reducing emissions, were fitted below the cylinder heads thus causing heat build up around the magnesium crankcase and then made worse by the lean running K-Jetronic CIS. The fitting of a 5-blade engine fan instead of the usual 11-blade further compounded the situation.
Bearing in mind Porsche's largest market being the US, the 930 Turbo, Carrera 3.0 and all subsequent models used aluminium alloy crankcases which were around  heavier.

The Bosch K-Jetronic CIS varied fuel pressure to the injectors dependent on the mass airflow.  While this system was exceedingly reliable, it did not allow the use of as "hot" cams as MFI or carburettors allowed. Therefore, the 911S's horsepower decreased from 190 to 175 PS (140–128 kW) despite the displacement increase from 2.4 to 2.7 L. However, the engine did have increased drivability.

Also produced for the 1976 "model year", for the U.S. market, was the 912E, a 4-cylinder version of the 911 like the 912 that had last been produced in 1969. It used the I-series chassis and the 2.0  Volkswagen engine from the Porsche 914. In all, 2099 units were produced. In 1976, the Porsche 924 took this car's place for the 1977 "model year" and beyond. The power was supplied by a 4-cylinder high-performance fuel injection motor also used in the Volkswagen 411. Less than 3,000 were built.

Carrera 3.0 (1976–1977)
The Carrera 3.0 was given the same diecast aluminium crankcase as the 930 or ’911 Turbo’.
Its 3-litre engine had K-Jetronic CIS fuel injection. Power output was slightly down on the Carrera 2.7 at  although the 188 lb/ft of torque was now available at 4,200 rpm. 

During its two-year life span, only 3687 cars were built.  Of these 2564 were coupés and 1123 Targas.

Turbo (Type 930) (1974–1989)

In 1974 Porsche introduced the first production turbocharged 911. Although called simply Porsche 911 Turbo in Europe, it was marketed as the Porsche 930 (930 being its internal type number) in North America. The body shape is distinctive, thanks to wide wheel-arches to accommodate the wide tires, and a large rear spoiler often known as a "whale tail" on the early cars, and "tea-tray" on the later ones. The early cars are known for their exhilarating acceleration coupled with challenging handling characteristics and extreme turbo lag.

Production figures of the car soon qualified its racing version for FIA Group 4 competition as the Porsche 934 of 1976. Many participated at Le Mans and other races including some epic battles with the BMW 3.0 CSL "Batmobile". The wilder Porsche 935, a finer tuned car in FIA Group 5 that evolved from the 2.1 L RSR Turbo of 1974, was first campaigned in 1976 by the factory, and despite subsequent withdrawal of the official works team after 1978, it ultimately won Le Mans outright in 1979 in the hands of the private Kremer Racing team. Privateers continued to compete successfully with the car until well into the 1980s.

Due to stricter emissions regulations, the 930 was withheld from the US and Japanese markets from 1981 through 1985. It was re-introduced into the United States in 1986.

As demand for the Turbo soared in the late 1980s, Porsche introduced novelty variants including a slant-nose version (option M505/M506), while not significantly improving the range mechanically. Although these cars could be sold for extraordinary premiums over the standard models, the company's reluctance to invest in research and development of the entire 911 line at that time turned out to be an almost fatal decision not only for the 911, but for the company.

Only in 1989, its last year of production, was the 930 equipped with a five-speed gearbox. The 930 was replaced in 1990 with a 964 version featuring the same 3.3 L engine.

There have been turbocharged variants of each subsequent generation of 911.

SC  / L, M, A, B, C and D series (1978–1983)

Starting in MY 1978, the new 3.0 L 911 SC (2,994 cc) was now the second generation basic 911 model. It was in effect a Carrera 3 (known as a 911S in the United States) detuned to provide . The "SC" designation was reintroduced by Porsche for the first time since the 356 SC (as distinguished from the race-engined 356 Carrera). No Carrera versions were produced and the 930 Turbo remaining at the top of the range. However, cars sold in the US market retained their lower-compression  engines throughout. This enabled them to be run on lower-octane fuel.

In model year 1980, Porsche offered a Weissach special edition version of the 911 SC, named after the town in Germany where Porsche has their research center. Designated M439, it was offered in two colors with the turbo whale tail & front chin spoiler, body color-matched  alloy wheels and other convenience features as standard. 408 cars were built for North America. In 1982, a Ferry Porsche Edition was made and a total of 200 cars were sold with this cosmetic package.

SCs sold in the UK could be specified with the Sport Group Package (UK) which added stiffer suspension, the rear spoiler, front rubber lip and black .

In 1981, a Cabriolet concept car was shown at the Frankfurt Motor Show. Not only was the car a true convertible, but it also featured four-wheel drive, although this was dropped in the production version. The first 911 Cabriolet debuted in late 1982, as a 1983 model. This was Porsche's first cabriolet since the 356 of the mid-1960s. It proved very popular with 4,214 sold in its introductory year, despite its premium price relative to the open-top targa. Cabriolet versions of the 911 have been offered ever since.

It was during this time, that Porsche AG decided the long-term fate of the 911. In 1979 Porsche had made plans to replace the 911 with their new 928. Sales of the 911 remained so strong however, that Porsche revised its strategy and decided to inject new life into the 911 editions.

Peter W. Schutz (CEO Porsche AG 1981–1987) wrote:
“The decision to keep the 911 in the product line occurred one afternoon in the office of Dr Helmuth Bott :de:Helmuth Bott, the Porsche operating board member responsible for all engineering and development.  I noticed a chart on the wall of Professor Bott’s office.  It depicted the ongoing development schedules for the three primary Porsche product lines: 944, 928 and 911.  Two of them stretched far into the future, but the 911 program stopped at the end of 1981.  I remember rising from my chair, walking over to the chart, taking a black marker pen, and extending the 911 program bar clean off the chart.  I am sure I heard a silent cheer from Professor Bott, and I knew I had done the right thing.  The Porsche 911, the company icon, had been saved, and I believe the company was saved with it.”

911 SC sales totaled 58,914 cars.

3.2 Carrera / E, F, G, H, I, J and K series (1984–1989)

With the 911's future ensured, 1983 saw the launch of a replacement for the successful SC series. It was the MY 1984 911 3.2 Carrera, reviving the Carrera name for the first time since 1977. The 911 3.2 Carrera was the second iteration of the 911 series, with all subsequent models featuring new body styling with new brake, electronic and suspension technologies.

A new, higher-displacement motor, a 3.2-liter horizontally opposed flat 6 cylinder, was utilized. At the time, Porsche claimed it was 80% new.  The new swept volume of 3,164 cc was achieved using the  bore (from the previous SC model) combined with the 1978 Turbo 3.3 crankshaft's  stroke. In addition, higher domed pistons increased the compression ratio from 9.8 to 10.3:1 (although only 9.5:1 for the US market). New inlet manifold and exhaust systems were fitted. The 915 transmission was carried over from the SC series for the first three model years. In 1987, the Carrera got a new five-speed gearbox sourced from Getrag, model number G50 with proven Borg-Warner synchronizers. This slightly heavier version also featured a hydraulically operated clutch.

Factory times were more modest: 0-60 mph time of 6.3 seconds for the US version and 6.1 seconds for cars outside the American market.

The disc brakes were increased in size to aid in more effective heat dissipation and improved oil-fed chain tensioners were fitted to the engine. To improve oil cooling, a finned cooler replaced the serpentine lines in the front passenger fender well. This was further improved in 1987, with the addition of a thermostatically controlled fan.

Driving refinement and motor reliability were improved with an upgrade of the fuel and ignition control components to a L-Jetronic with Bosch Motronics 2 DME (Digital Motor Electronics system). An improvement in fuel-efficiency was due to the DME providing a petrol cut-off on the overrun. Custom-mapped chips remain a popular upgrade. The fuel relay that is mounted externally on the DME is known to be a weak point of the system.

Three basic models were available throughout the Carrera years – coupé, targa and cabriolet. When launched in 1984 in the United States, the prices of the 911 Carrera lineup were $31,950 for the coupé, $33,450 for the targa and $36,450 for the cabriolet. Almost indistinguishable from the SC, external clues are the front fog lights, which were integrated into the front valance in the Carrera. Very modest cosmetic changes were made throughout the lifespan of the Carrera, with a redesigned dash featuring larger air conditioning vents appearing in 1986.

Two special editions of the Carrera were produced – the "Commemorative Edition" in 1988 to commemorate 250,000 911s produced and an "Anniversary" edition in 1989 which was the model's 25th year of production. Both were cosmetic packages with limited production.

In 1984, Porsche also introduced the M491 option. Officially called the Supersport, it was commonly known as the "Turbo-look". It was a style that resembled the Porsche 930 Turbo with wide wheel arches and the distinctive "tea tray” tail. It featured the stiffer turbo suspension and the superior turbo braking system as well as the wider turbo wheels.  Sales of the Supersport were particularly strong for its first two years in the United States because the desirable 930 was not available.

The 911 Speedster (option M503), a low-roof version of the Cabriolet which was evocative of the Porsche 356 Speedster of the 1950s, was produced in limited numbers (2,104) between January 1989 and July 1989 as both a narrow body car and a Turbo-look, which also featured 930 brakes, wheels, suspension, and front valence. 171 narrow body examples were built, and 823 examples were built for the US market. It started as a design under Helmuth Bott  in 1983 but was not manufactured until six years later, championed by Porsche's president, the German-American Peter Schutz. A prototype based in the 911SC was shown at the Frankfurt Motor Show in 1987, reworked by chief stylist Tony Lapine. It was a two-seat convertible that featured a low swept windshield and a pair of controversial 'camel hump' cowlings behind the seats that concealed the stowed-away manual hood.

In 1985, Porsche built a Club Sport prototype with the identification number WP0ZZZ91ZF100848. Later on in that year, a Carrera Club Sport (RoW) with the identification number WP0ZZZ91ZFS101166 was special ordered after a Porsche driver was particularly inspired by the Club Sport prototype on the track. By 1989, the Club Sport was no longer produced which makes it today a collectible with its blueprinted engine and low production numbers. Total production of the 911 3.2 Carrera series was 76,473 cars (35,670 coupé, 19,987 cabrio, 18,468 targa).

In late 1989, the 911 underwent a major evolution, with the introduction of the Type Porsche 964 (1989–1993).

Position vis-à-vis the Porsche 928

When 911 sales began to decline by the early 1970s, Porsche executives approved work on the Porsche 928 in 1971. Larger and featuring a front-mounted V8 engine considerably more powerful than the contemporary 911's flat six, the 928 was intended to be a comfortable grand tourer rather than a dedicated sports car. Capable of out-accelerating and even matching or exceeding the 911's cornering prowess in some model years, the 928 sold reasonably well from its introduction in 1977 until its discontinuation in 1995. In spite of its overall capability, it never outsold the 911, and unlike its smaller, sportier sibling, it achieved little success in racing.

Motorsport
The Porsche factory's first 911-based race car was a lightly modified 1964 Type 901. It finished fifth in the 1965 Monte Carlo Rally and is now housed in the Porsche Museum.

Porsche 911s dominated the Trans Am Series under two liter class in the sixties, winning the championship from 1967 to 1969. They would later go on to win the championship in 1973, 1974, and 1980. Despite Trans Am being a sedan championship in its early years, the Porsche 911 was a sports car. Its inclusion is likely due to its resemblance to a coupé.

References

Further reading
 Frère, P (2006). Porsche 911 Story (eighth edition). J H Haynes & Co Ltd. 
 Meredith, L (2000). Porsche 911. Sutton Publishing. .
 Morgan, P (1995). Original Porsche 911. MBI Publishing. 
 Wood, J (1997). Porsche: The Legend. Parragon. .
 Raby, P (2005) "Porsche 911 Identification Guide". Herridge & Son. 
 Wilkinson, Stephan (2005) "The Gold-Plated Porsche". The Lyons Press. , rebuilding a 911.

External links

 1965 Porsche 911 ‘545’ Sports Purpose 
 Porsche 911 Carrera 3.0 Website and Registry 
 Porsche 911S - restoration project 
 Porsche 911 turbo - the first and second generation 
 Radio List for Porsche (1974-1989)

911
Cars introduced in 1964
1970s cars
1980s cars
1990s cars
2000s cars
Cars powered by boxer engines
Convertibles
Coupés
Group B cars
Rally cars
Rear-engined vehicles
Sports cars